Hold That Lion may refer to:

 Hold That Lion (1926 film), a silent comedy
 Hold That Lion! (1947 film), a short comedy starring The Three Stooges